Dualism most commonly refers to:

 Mind–body dualism, a philosophical view which holds that mental phenomena are, at least in certain respects, not physical phenomena, or that the mind and the body are distinct and separable from one another
 Property dualism, a view in the philosophy of mind and metaphysics which holds that, although the world is composed of just one kind of substance—the physical kind—there exist two distinct kinds of properties: physical properties and mental properties
 Cosmological dualism, the theological or spiritual view that there are only two fundamental concepts, such as "good" and "evil", and that these two concepts are in every way opposed to one another

Dualism may also refer to:
 Dualism (cybernetics), systems or problems in which an intelligent adversary attempts to exploit the weaknesses of the investigator
 Dualism (Indian philosophy), the belief held by certain schools of Indian philosophy that reality is fundamentally composed of two parts
 Dualism (politics), the separation of powers between the cabinet and parliament
 Dualism in medieval politics, opposition to hierocracy (medieval)
 Epistemological dualism, the epistemological question of whether the world we see around us is the real world itself or merely an internal perceptual copy of that world generated by neural processes in our brain
 Ethical dualism, the attribution of good solely to one group of people and evil to another
 Monism and dualism in international law, a principle in contending that international and domestic law are distinct systems of law, and that international law only applies to the extent that it does not conflict with domestic law
 Soul dualism, the belief that a person has two (or more) kinds of souls

Media
 Dualism (album), a 2011 album by Dutch metal band Textures
 Dualist (album), a 2011 album by Taken by Cars
 Dualism, a novel by Bill DeSmedt

See also

 Bipartite (disambiguation)
 Dialectical monism
 Dual (disambiguation)
 Duality (disambiguation)
 Duality (electrical circuits)
 Duality (mathematics), translates concepts, theorems or mathematical structures into other concepts, theorems or structures, in a one-to-one fashion, often (but not always) by means of an involution operation
 List of dualities
 Monism
 Nondualism